Sky Towers is a canceled mixed complex project in Cluj Napoca. It had three buildings of 32 floors each and a total surface for all three buildings of 150,000 m2.

The first tower was structured as a 4 star hotel up to the 16th floor and the rest of the building is a 3 star hotel. The second building was an office building, and the third tower houses residential units smaller than 200 m2.

External links
Reference 

Skyscrapers in Romania
Buildings and structures completed in 2010